John Joseph Keogh (June 17, 1886 – February 13, 1955) was a professional football head coach for the Hartford Blues during their only season in the National Football League, in 1926. Prior to the 1926 season, Keogh was an assistant coach at the University of Pennsylvania. Outside of football, he worked as a dentist in Philadelphia. The contract offered to him by Blues owner George Mulligan was for $7,500 and allowed him to practice in that city three days each week.

References

1886 births
1955 deaths
American dentists
Hartford Blues coaches
Haverford Fords football coaches
Penn Quakers football coaches
Players of American football from Pennsylvania
20th-century dentists